Three Mile Island Nuclear Generating Station (commonly abbreviated as TMI) is a closed nuclear power plant on Three Mile Island in Londonderry Township, Dauphin County, Pennsylvania on Lake Frederic, a reservoir in the Susquehanna River just south of Harrisburg. It has two separate units, TMI-1 (owned by Constellation Energy) and TMI-2 (owned by EnergySolutions).

The plant was the site of the most significant accident in United States commercial nuclear energy when, on March 28, 1979, TMI-2 suffered a partial meltdown. According to the Nuclear Regulatory Commission (NRC) report, the accident resulted in no deaths or injuries to plant workers or in nearby communities. Follow-up epidemiology studies did not find causality between the accident and any increase in cancers. One work-related death has occurred on-site during decommissioning.

The reactor core of TMI-2 has since been removed from the site, but the site has not been fully decommissioned. In July 1998, Amergen Energy (now Exelon Generation) agreed to purchase TMI-1 from General Public Utilities for $100 million.

The plant was originally built by General Public Utilities Corporation, later renamed GPU Incorporated. The plant was operated by Metropolitan Edison Company (Met-Ed), a subsidiary of the GPU Energy division. In 2001, GPU Inc. merged with FirstEnergy Corporation. On December 18, 2020 - FirstEnergy transferred Unit 2's license over to EnergySolutions' subsidiary TMI-2 Solutions after receiving approval from the NRC.

Exelon was operating Unit 1 at a financial loss since 2015. In 2017 the company said it would consider ceasing operations at Unit 1 because of high costs unless there was action from the Pennsylvania government. Unit 1 officially shut down at noon on September 20, 2019.

Unit 1 decommissioning is expected to be completed in 2079 and will cost $1.2 billion. Unit 2, which has been dormant since the accident in 1979, is expected to close in 2037.

Emergency zones and nearby population

The 2010 U.S. population within  of Three Mile Island was 211,261, an increase of 10.9 percent in a decade, according to an analysis of U.S. Census data. The 2010 U.S. population within  was 2,803,322, an increase of 10.3 percent since 2000. Cities within 50 miles include Harrisburg (12 miles to city center), York (13 miles to city center), and Lancaster (24 miles to city center).

Electricity Production 
During its last full year of operation in 2018, Three Mile Island generated 7,355 GWh of electricity. In that same year, electricity from nuclear power produced approximately 39% of the total electricity generated in Pennsylvania (83.5 TWh nuclear of 215 TWh total), with Three Mile Island Generating Station contributing approximately 4% to the statewide total generation. In 2021 the state of Pennsylvania generated approximately 241 TWh total electricity.

Three Mile Island Unit 1
The Three Mile Island Unit 1 is a pressurized water reactor designed by Babcock & Wilcox with a net generating capacity of 819 MWe. Unit 1 first came online on April 19, 1974, and began commercial operations on September 2, 1974. TMI-1 is licensed to operate for 40 years from its first run, and in 2009, was extended 20 years, which means it could have operated until April 19, 2034.

TMI-1 had a closed-cycle cooling system for its main condenser using two natural draft cooling towers. Makeup water was drawn from the river to replace the water lost via evaporation in the towers. Once-through cooling with river water is used for the service water system which cools auxiliary components and removed decay heat when the reactor was shut down. On February 17, 1979, TMI-1 went offline for refueling. It was brought back online on October 9, 1985, after public opposition, several federal court injunctions, and some technical and regulatory complications - more than six years after it initially went offline.

Unit 1 was scheduled to be shut down by September 2019 after Exelon announced they did not receive any commitments for subsidies from the state, rendering Exelon unable to continue operating the reactor. TMI-1 was shut down on September 20, 2019.

Incidents 
In February 1993, a man drove his car past a checkpoint at the TMI nuclear plant, then broke through an entry gate. He eventually crashed the car through a secure door and entered the Unit 1 turbine building. The intruder, who had a history of mental illness, hid in the turbine building and was apprehended after four hours.

During and following the September 11 attacks, there was a moral panic that United Airlines Flight 93 was headed towards Three Mile Island. On that day, the NRC placed all of the nation's nuclear power plants into the highest level of security. United Flight 93 crashed into a field about 135 miles west (217 km) of Three Mile Island in Stonycreek Township, just outside Shanksville, Pennsylvania, with its actual target believed to be intended for Washington, D.C.

On November 21, 2009, a release of radioactivity occurred inside the containment building of TMI-1 while workers were cutting pipes. Exelon Corporation stated to the public that "A monitor at the temporary opening cut into the containment building wall to allow the new steam generators to be moved inside showed a slight increase in a reading and then returned to normal. Approximately 20 employees were treated for mild radiation exposure." , it was believed that no radiation escaped the containment building and the public was not in any danger. The inside airborne contamination was caused by a change in air pressure inside the containment building that dislodged small irradiated particles in the reactor piping system. Some of the small particles became airborne inside the building and were detected by an array of monitors in place to detect such material. The air pressure change occurred when inside building ventilation fans were started to support outage activities. The site modified the ventilation system to prevent future air pressure changes. Work continued on the project the following day. On January 24, 2010, TMI-1 was brought back online.

Material handling accident 
On September 10, 2021, a contractor from Alabama was fatally injured while unloading equipment from a truck. Fire and emergency medical personnel from Londonderry Township were dispatched and declared the contractor dead on arrival. The Nuclear Regulatory Commission said the injury was work-related, and the contractor was outside the radiological controlled area.

Three Mile Island Unit 2
The Three Mile Island Unit 2 was also a pressurized water reactor constructed by B&W, similar to Unit 1. The only difference was that TMI-2 was slightly larger with a net generating capacity of 906 MWe, compared to TMI-1, which delivers 819 MWe. Unit 2 received its operating license on February 8, 1978, and began commercial operation on December 30, 1978. TMI Unit 2 has been permanently shut off after the Three Mile Island accident in 1979.

Accident

On March 28, 1979, a cooling system malfunction caused a partial meltdown of the reactor core. This loss-of-coolant accident resulted in the release of an estimated 43,000 curies (1.59 PBq) of radioactive krypton-85 gas (half life 10 yrs), and less than 20 curies (740 GBq) of the especially hazardous iodine-131 (half life 8 days), into the surrounding environment.

Nearly 2 million people were exposed to radiation from the accident. A review by the World Nuclear Association concluded that no deaths, injuries or adverse health effects resulted from the accident, and a report by Columbia University epidemiologist Maureen Hatch confirmed this finding. Because of the health concerns, the Pennsylvania Department of Health kept a registry of more than 30,000 people that lived within 5 miles of TMI at the time of the accident. The registry was kept for nearly 20 years until 1997, when no evidence was found of unusual health effects. Further epidemiology studies have not shown any increase in cancer as a result of the accident. However, almost $25 million was paid in insurance settlements to people who then agreed not to discuss their injuries in ongoing litigation.

Unit 2 has not been operational since the accident occurred.

The New York Times reported on August 14, 1993, 14 years after the accident, that the cleanup had been finished. According to the United States NRC, 2.3 million gallons of waste water had been removed.

The incident was widely publicized internationally, and had far-reaching effects on public opinion, particularly in the United States. The China Syndrome, a movie about a nuclear disaster, which was released 12 days before the incident and received a glowing reception from the movie-going public, became a blockbuster hit.

Unit 2 Generator
On January 22, 2010, officials at the NRC announced the electrical generator from the damaged Unit 2 reactor at TMI will be used at Shearon Harris Nuclear Plant in New Hill, North Carolina. The generator was transported in two parts, weighing a combined 670 tons. It was refurbished and installed during a refueling outage at Shearon Harris NPP in November 2010. TMI's Unit 2 reactor has been shut down since the partial meltdown in 1979.

Post-accident 
Exelon Corporation was created in October 2000 by the merger of PECO Energy Company and Unicom, of Philadelphia and Chicago respectively. Unicom owned Commonwealth Edison. The PECO share in AmerGen was acquired by Exelon during late 2000. Exelon acquired British Energy's share in AmerGen in 2003, and transferred Unit 1 under the direct ownership and operation of its Exelon Nuclear business unit. According to Exelon Corporation, "many people are surprised when they learn that Three Mile Island is still making electricity, enough to power 800,000 households" from its undamaged and fully functional reactor unit 1. Exelon viewed the plant's economics of $44/MWh as challenging due to the low price of natural gas at $25/MWh. As of 2016, the average price of electricity in the area was $39/MWh.

Closure

On June 20, 2017, Exelon Generation, the owners of Three Mile Island's Unit 1, sent to the Nuclear Regulatory Commission a formal notice of its intention to shut down the plant on September 30, 2019, unless the Pennsylvania legislature rescued the nuclear industry, which was struggling to compete as newfound natural gas resources drove down electricity prices. Exelon Generation's Senior Vice President Bryan Hanson noted that once Three Mile Island was closed, it could never be reopened for use again. Hanson explicitly stated the reason for the shutdown is because of the unprofitability of Unit 1. Unit 1 has lost the company over $300 million over the last half-decade despite it being one of Exelon's best-performing power plants.

Shut down of Unit 1 can go in two possible directions, the first being the immediate dismantlement after the radioactive fuel has been moved away from the plant. The dismantlement can proceed after the spent fuel is removed from the pool, put into storage casks, and the casks are transferred to the ISFSI pad for storage until the DOE takes them away to a DOE repository. Dismantling the plant this way will take anywhere from 8 to 10 years. The second option Exelon could take is the long-term storage, which involves mothballing the plant and letting the radiation decay for up to 60 years on its own to a harmless level before completely dismantling the buildings. The advantage to the long-term storage is the lack of radiation when the dismantlement would begin but the disadvantage would be the possible lack of qualified workers at the time of dismantlement. Exelon would also have to pay for limited maintenance and security of the plant over the potential 60 years. The entirety of the spent fuel will be moved to the Londonderry Township facility, which is another process that could take decades to complete.

About 70 state legislators signed the industry-inspired Nuclear Caucus but made no financial commitments.

In April 2019, Exelon stated it would cost $1.2 billion over nearly 60 years to completely decommission Unit 1. Unit 1 closed on September 20, 2019.

In 2022, Unit 1 was transferred to Constellation Energy following separation from Exelon. Unit 2 was also transferred to TriArtisan ES Partners, LLC - following their acquisition of EnergySolutions.

Decommissioning 
Following the TMI-2 accident in 1979, approximately 99% of the fuel and damaged core debris was removed from the reactor vessel and associated systems and shipped to the Idaho National Laboratory near Idaho Falls, Idaho. Since 1993, when the initial cleanup of the plant was completed, TMI-2 has been in a condition known as Post Defueling Monitored Storage (PDMS) and is under constant monitoring to ensure the plant's safety and stability.

The cost of decommissioning a closed nuclear reactor and related structures at Three Mile Island is estimated at $918 million.

Seismic risk 
The Nuclear Regulatory Commission's estimate of the risk each year of an earthquake intense enough to cause core damage to the reactor at Three Mile Island was 1 in 25,000, according to an NRC study published in August 2010.

See also

 Chernobyl disaster
 Fukushima Daiichi nuclear disaster

Notes

References

External links

Three Mile Island page on the operator's website
Three Mile Island – Three Mile Island Alert

Energy infrastructure completed in 1974
Energy infrastructure completed in 1978
Nuclear power plants in Pennsylvania
Three Mile Island accident
Buildings and structures in Dauphin County, Pennsylvania
Towers in Pennsylvania
Nuclear power stations using pressurized water reactors
Susquehanna River
FirstEnergy
1974 establishments in Pennsylvania
Former nuclear power stations in the United States